Anjuman is a Pakistani colour film  released on 31 July 1970, starring Waheed Murad, Rani, Deeba, Santosh Kumar, Sabiha Khanam and Lehri. The film was released during the hey days of Murad and became a milestone in his career. The film was produced by Safdar Masud under the banner Ideal Movies and directed by Hassan Tariq, a well-known Pakistani film director.

The film was released at the worst possible political situation of the country with Bangladesh war of independence raging in former East Pakistan. Nevertheless, the film became a huge success, with famous tracks by Runa Laila and Ahmed Rushdi.

The film won 8 Nigar Awards in the categories of best film, best director, best screenplay, best musician, best lyricist, best playback female singer, best editor, best art director and best comedian.

Plot
The film is a tragedy based on a tawaif (courtesan) 'Anjuman' played by Rani,a "tawaiif" who flirts with the emotions of a wealthy Nawab Wajahat Ali (Santosh Kumar) and later falls in love with his younger brother Nawab Asif Ali played by Waheed Murad. In order to save his older brother's marriage, Asif decides to frequent Anjuman's "kotha" in an "exchange" demanded by Anjuman, although Asif being in love with another girl Nudrat (played by Deeba). Noorulain Zartaj (Sabiha Khanum), wife of Nawab Wajahat Ali, eventually implores Anjuman javed to forsake her own love so that Asif can live happily. At the end, Anjuman has to face a fate worse than death, where she is invited to sing at the wedding of her lover.  Lovelorn and disappointed Anjuman offers a woeful song, as she has swallowed poison, and dies at the feet of her lover.

Cast
 Rani Begum as Anjuman
 Waheed Murad as Asif Ali
 Santosh Kumar as Wajahat Ali
 Sabiha Khanam as wife of Wajahat
 Deeba as Nudrat
 Lehri
 Ragini as Maya Devi

Music
The music was directed by Nisar Bazmi. Songs of the film, especially sung by Runa Laila, became a huge success in Pakistan:
Izhar bhi mushkil hai... by Noor Jehan
Bhabhi meri bhabhi... by Ahmed Rushdi
Bhabhi meri bhabhi... (sad) by Ahmed Rushdi
Aap Dil Ki Anjuman Mein... by Runa Laila
Dil Dharke Main Tum Se... by Runa Laila
Yadash bakhair bachpan mein... by Ahmed Rushdi
Lag rahi hei mujhe... by Ahmed Rushdi

Release
Anjuman was released on 31 July 1970, at the worst political time of Pakistan, by Babar Pictures. The film ran for continuously 81 weeks at cinemas in Karachi. The film celebrated a Platinum Jubilee and became a huge success for the year 1970.

Remake 
It was remade as a television film in 2013 with the same name, which starred Imran Abbas Naqvi, Sara Loren, Alyy Khan, directed by Yasir Nawaz  and produced by Tarang Housefull.

Awards
Anjuman won 8 Nigar Awards in the following categories:

References

External links
 

1970 films
1970s Urdu-language films
Pakistani musical films
Nigar Award winners
Pakistani romantic drama films
Films scored by Nisar Bazmi
1970 romantic drama films
Urdu-language Pakistani films